Zigzag is a jagged, regular pattern.

Zigzag, ZigZag, zig zag or zig-zag may also refer to:

Film and television
Zigzag (1963 film)
Zig Zag (1970 film), a film by Richard A. Colla
Zig Zag (2002 film), a film by David S. Goyer
Zig Zag (Canadian TV series)
Zig Zag, an educational TV series on BBC Schools
Zigzag, a character in The Thief and the Cobbler
"Zig Zag", an episode of The Outer Limits, season 6

Music and theatre
Zig-Zag!, a 1917 musical revue
Zig Zag (The Hooters album) (1989)
Zig Zag (Tha Mexakinz album) (1994)
Zig Zag, a 2003 album by Earl Slick
Zig Zags, a heavy metal/punk rock band

Culture
ZigZag (magazine), a UK rock music magazine
Zig Zag (manga), a cartoon series by Yuki Nakaji

Computer science
ZigZag (software), a data model designed and patented by Ted Nelson
Zig-zag product, a method for constructing graphs in computational complexity
Zig-Zag, a tree-rotation variant used to balance splay trees
Zig-zag entropy coding, a method used in JPEG images to compress data
ZigZag encoding, a mapping of the signed integers to unsigned integers that shortens variable-length quantity representations of negative integers

Geography
Zig Zag Pass, site of the Struggle on Zig Zag Pass in the Philippines during World War II
Zigzag, Oregon
Zigzag Glacier
Zigzag Ranger Station
Zigzag River and Little Zigzag River
Zigzag Bluff in Antarctica
Zigzag Island off the coast of Antarctica
Zigzag Pass on the island of South Georgia

Mathematics and cryptography
Boustrophedon transform, a zigzag reordering
Fence (mathematics) or zigzag poset, a partially ordered set
Zig-zag lemma, a mathematical lemma in homological algebra
Zigzag cipher, a type of cipher, or code

Railroads
Zig zag (railway), a construction technique railroads use to climb hills; also called a switchback
Lapstone Zig Zag, a walking track on the line of an abandoned railway
Zig Zag Railway, a heritage railway near Lithgow
Zig Zag railway station, a railway station on the CityRail network near Lithgow, New South Wales
Kalamunda Zig Zag in Western Australia
Perry Bridge or Zig Zag Bridge, a 1711 bridge over River Tame in Perry Barr, Birmingham, England

Revolvers
Mauser Zig-Zag, a 19th-century revolver
Zig zag revolver, a 3D-printed revolver developed in Japan

Architecture
Zig-Zag Chair, designed by Gerrit Rietveld
Zig-zag moulding on Norman arches
Zigzag moderne, a term used in Art Deco

Animals
Phasianella zigzag, a species of sea snail
Northern zigzag salamander
Ozark zigzag salamander
Southern zigzag salamander
Zigzag barb, a ray-finned fish
Zigzag heron, a bird
Zigzagiceras, an extinct cephalopod genus

Plants
 The zigzag model of plant-pathogen co-evolution by Jonathan D. G. Jones and Jeffery Dangl

Other uses
Boustrophedon, writing in alternating directions
Zig Zag (video game), a 1984 video game
Zig-Zag (company), a tobacco products company
Zig-zag bridge, a type of pedestrian walkway
USS Zigzag (SP-106), a patrol vessel that served in the United States Navy from 1917 to 1919
Agent Zigzag, code name of Eddie Chapman, a British double agent
Zig-zag in-line package, a short-lived packaging technology for integrated circuits
Zigzag transformer, an engineering device for electrical systems
ZigZag, a ticketing scheme in Derbyshire, UK, by bus operator Trent Barton
Zig Zag Girl, a stage magic illusion

See also
Zag (disambiguation)
Zig (disambiguation)
Zig and Zag (disambiguation)
Zik Zak Filmworks